The Englishman who Went up a Hill but Came down a Mountain is a 1995 romantic comedy film with a story by Ifor David Monger and Ivor Monger, written and directed by Christopher Monger. It was entered into the 19th Moscow International Film Festival and was screened in the Un Certain Regard section at the 1995 Cannes Film Festival.

The film is based on a story heard by Christopher Monger from his grandfather about the real village of Taff's Well, in the old county of Glamorgan, and its neighbouring Garth Hill. Due to 20th century urbanisation of the area, it was filmed in the more rural Llanrhaeadr-ym-Mochnant and Llansilin in Powys.

Plot
In 1917, during World War I, two English cartographers, the pompous George Garrad and his junior, Reginald Anson arrive at the fictional Welsh village of Ffynnon Garw to measure its "mountain" – only to cause outrage when they conclude that it is only a hill because it is slightly short of the required height of 1,000 feet (305 m).

The villagers, aided and abetted by wily local, Morgan the Goat, and the Reverend Mr. Jones who, after initially opposing the scheme, grasps its symbolism in restoring the community's war-damaged self-esteem, conspire to delay the cartographers' departure while they build an earth mound on top of the hill and make it high enough to be considered a mountain.

The scene is set with Anson and Garrad the cartographers (who are to measure the mountain) arriving at the village, but everyone in town is at church (it being a Sunday). The only exception is Morgan the Goat who manages the local inn and is the only redhead in the village. Most of the men of the town are away at war and the film implies that the women are visiting the inn and having redheaded children. On the first day Anson and Garrad reach the top and do some preliminary measurements and come up with a height of 930 feet. Anson returns and reassures them that they have more accurate measurements to make the next day.

The next day, when they go to the mountain the entire village is milling around the mountain and eagerly anticipating the results. The cartographers after the measurements announce that the more accurate measurements indicate a height of 984 feet which is just 16 feet short of the 1,000 feet needed to qualify the "hill" as a mountain. The townsfolk are crestfallen and the town pastor announces a town hall meeting. In the meeting Morgan the Goat proposes that they raise the mountain by 20 feet and one of the leadership agrees saying that they have seen mountains with permanent structures atop them like tombs.

Morgan, the constable and the village elder return to the cartographers to persuade them to stay while they build a structure on the mountain but Anson the cartographer disagrees and says they have a tight schedule and they will be leaving in the morning.

The next morning, everyone rallies and starts digging earth from their backyards and transporting it to hill to add 20 or so feet to it. The first day they make a mound that is approximately 14 feet high. Meanwhile in town someone has sabotaged the car belonging to the cartographer and the pastor just to be sure also punctures a tire. The cartographers have to push the car to the mechanic who does not know anything about the car but deliberately fumbles around and breaks a part and then informs the cartographers that the part will be needed to be brought in from Cardiff.

When the cartographers try to catch a train from the local station, they are misinformed that the trains only carry coal by the station master who is colluding with the townspeople to keep them in the town. Morgan also enlists a local lady to entertain the two Englishmen.

At this point, it starts raining and the mud on the hill starts washing off down from 14 feet to 10 feet. Morgan declares an emergency and asks the mechanic to remove the tarp covering the car belonging to the cartographers and to take it to the mountain to cover the works under construction. Meanwhile, in town, the two cartographers are entertained by a local lady.

The rain continues all night and all day from Thursday to Sunday. On Sunday, the pastor of the church encourages the villagers to finish the work they started. Upon the suggestion of the Englishman Anson, they also cover the mound with sod before the last light. The pastor then dies and is buried on the mountain.

After the burial the townspeople convince Anson to stay the night and measure the mountain first thing in the morning at the break of dawn because their train leaves at around 8 AM. Anson stays on the mountain with Betty who offers to keep him company and they kiss.

When Anson descends from the mountain, he informs the people that the mountain is 1,002 feet high and announces his engagement. The end of the movie describes the mountain settling down to 997 feet and turning back into a hill from a mountain. The spirit of the Reverend buried on the mountain exhales "a hill" in a groan and all the people rally in modern day Wales with buckets and earth to raise the mountain again.

Cast
 Hugh Grant as Reginald Anson
 Ian McNeice as George Garrad
 Tara Fitzgerald as Elizabeth/Betty from Cardiff
 Colm Meaney as Morgan the Goat
 Ian Hart as Johnny Shellshocked
 Robert Pugh as Williams the Petroleum 
 Kenneth Griffith as the Reverend Robert Jones
 Ieuan Rhys as Sgt Thomas

Production

Writing 
In the script there is a joke which is not obvious to non-Welsh speakers. A mechanic is asked about a nondescript broken part he has removed from a car, and replies "Well I don't know the English word, but in Welsh we call it a be'chi'ngalw."  In Welsh, be'chi'ngalw is a placeholder name, like "whatchamacallit" or "thingamajig" in English. and literally means "what [do] you call" and is a contracted form of "beth dych chi'n galw". The joke is made obvious in the novel published after the film's release.

Release
The film grossed $11 million in the United States and Canada and $21 million worldwide.

Reception

In regard to its humorous and affectionate description of the locals, the film has often been compared with Waking Ned, a comedy film written and directed by Kirk Jones. The movie has resulted in a stream of visitors climbing to the summit of The Garth, and the Pentyrch History Society and the local community council have erected a notice on the mountain to explain its real historical significance.

On Rotten Tomatoes, the film holds a rating of 67% from 33 reviews. The consenus states: "With an ample serving of Hugh Grant's trademark charm, a quirky Welsh town comes together to put their town on the map in this feel-good folksy tale."

Parody
The VeggieTales episode, "King George and the Ducky", includes a skit called "The Englishman Who Went Up A Hill (And Came Down With All The Bananas)". It quickly spirals out of control with the addition of "The Swede Who Went Up A Hill (And Came Down With All The Strawberries)".

See also
English-language accents in film – Welsh
 Foel Penolau, a mountain in Wales that until 2018 had been considered a hill.
Mynydd Graig Goch, a member of the Moel Hebog group of summits.
 Mount Massive in Colorado - Contention arose over whether Massive or its neighbor, Mount Elbert, which have a height difference of only , was the highest Rocky mountain and second highest mountain in the contiguous United States, after Mount Whitney.  This led to a dispute which came to a head with the Mount Massive supporters building large piles of stones on the summit to boost its height, only to have the Mount Elbert proponents demolish them.

References

External links

 
 
 
 
 Englishman Who Went Up A Hill – Backsights Magazine (Surveyors Historical Society), originally published in Professional Surveyor, Nov./Dec. 1998

1995 films
American romantic comedy films
British romantic comedy films
1995 romantic comedy films
1990s English-language films
Films set in Wales
Films directed by Christopher Monger
Films set in 1917
Films shot at Pinewood Studios
Miramax films
1990s American films
1990s British films